Cédric Berrest (born 2 April 1985 in Toulouse) is a French rower. He competed at the 2008 Summer Olympics, where he won a bronze medal in quadruple scull. Many times French champion in single scull, Cédric Berrest scored the best time at the 2009 CRASH-B of Boston, a world erg competition. The athlete is still very present in the rowing world, strongly scoring great times on his single scull and erg competition. Cédric now rows at Toulouse and is still in the French team A.

References

External links 
 
 
 
 

1985 births
Living people
French male rowers
Olympic bronze medalists for France
Olympic rowers of France
Rowers at the 2004 Summer Olympics
Rowers at the 2008 Summer Olympics
Rowers at the 2012 Summer Olympics
Olympic medalists in rowing
Medalists at the 2008 Summer Olympics
World Rowing Championships medalists for France
European Rowing Championships medalists
21st-century French people